Syderos was a town of ancient Pontus, inhabited during Roman and Byzantine times. 

Its site is located near  in Asiatic Turkey.

References

Populated places in ancient Pontus
Former populated places in Turkey
Roman towns and cities in Turkey
Populated places of the Byzantine Empire
History of Tokat Province